Stephanie Kalesavich Buono (born May 31, 1984) is an American former competitive pair skater. With Aaron Parchem, she is the 2000 Golden Spin of Zagreb champion and the 2001 Nebelhorn Trophy bronze medalist. They competed at one ISU Championship, the 2002 Four Continents, where they placed fifth.

Personal life
Stephanie Kalesavich was born in Ann Arbor, Michigan, United States. She married Michael Buono in around 2005 and has three daughters, Gabriella, Aria and Liliana.

Career
Kalesavich began skating at age eight. In 1997, she won a U.S. national title on the novice level with Amaan Archer. The pair competed at one ISU Junior Grand Prix event, in the autumn of 1998.

Coaches at the Detroit Skating Club paired Kalesavich with Aaron Parchem in March 1999. The pair won the junior title at the 2000 U.S. Championships with all first-place ordinals in the free skate.

In 2001, Kalesavich/Parchem began competing internationally and won a pewter medal at the 2001 U.S. Championships. The following year, the pair placed second after the short program, but were narrowly edged out for the silver by Scott/Dulebohn after the free skate. As bronze medalists, Kalesavich/Parchem were named the first Olympic alternates in that year. Their partnership ended just after the 2003 U.S. Championships.

Kalesavich coaches young skaters of all levels at the Onyx-Suburban Skating Academy in Rochester and Macomb Township, Michigan.

Programs
(with Parchem)

Results

With Archer

With Parchem

References

1984 births
American female pair skaters
Living people
Sportspeople from Ann Arbor, Michigan
Competitors at the 2001 Goodwill Games
21st-century American women
20th-century American women